Jean-Marie Riachi (Arabic: جان ماري رياشي, born in 1970, Ras Baalbek.) is a Lebanese musician, arranger, composer and producer.

Biography 
Born on May 24, 1970, in Ras Baalbek, he graduated in musicology from the Holy Spirit University of Kaslik (USEK) university, and later began his music career performing in local bars and clubs.

In 1988 he participated in Studio el Fan, a Lebanese talent show, where he performed the keyboards.

In 1999, Riachi launched his musical production and composing career when he produced his first single performed by Elissa, Baddi Doub.

In 2001 he established his own Jean Marie Audio Productions studio in Rabieh, Lebanon.

In 2006, he arranged the song “Light the Way” which was sung by Majida El Roumi and José Carreras in Doha at the 2006 Asian Games opening ceremony.

In 2009, he produced the album “Belaaks” with the singers Ramy Ayach and Yara, which is a fusion style or oriental and jazz, and produced many albums for artists like the Majida El Roumi's (called Ghazal) and a Christmas album (called Castana), as well as other hits for the most famous Arabic singers: Nawal El Zoghbi, Haifa Wehbe, Latifa, Rami Ayach. He currently is the producer of The Voice, the Arabic edition of the international talent show, and he has won many Music Awards including the Lebanese prestigious Lebabnese Murex D’or.

Awards 
 2003 - Murex D’or: Best Song: "Ayshalak" by Elissa
 2004 - World Music Awards: "Ma Trouhsh Beid" by Latifa
 2005 - World Music Awards: Best-Selling Album in Lebanon and North Africa: "Ahla Donya" by Elissa
 2006 - Murex D’or: Best Composition and Arrangement, Habaytak Ana”, by Rami Ayach
 2008 - Murex D’or: Best Movie Soundtrack for “Sea of Stars”
 2008 - Murex D’or: Best Music Arranger
 2010 - Platinum Award: Best-selling album in the Middle-East: “Belaaks”
 2012 - Zahrit el Khalij: Best music arranger and producer
 2012 - Bisara7a.com: Best music arranger and producer
 2013 - Green Award by the Ministry of Environment and UNDP

See also 

 Elias Rahbani
Tarek Abou Jaoude
Hadi Sharara
 Guy Manoukian
Maritta Hallani

References

External links 
 https://jmr.studio/

1970 births
People from Baalbek District
Lebanese musicians
Lebanese composers
Holy Spirit University of Kaslik alumni
Studio El Fan
Living people
Lebanese record producers